Hemithyrsocera palliata is a species of cockroach endemic to the South Asia. Its pronotum is sub-elliptical and is black with a golden yellow margin.

References

Cockroaches
Insects described in 1798